Recharge is a business news website and quarterly magazine covering the global renewable energy industry, particularly wind and solar power. It is owned by Norway's NHST Media Group, but headquartered in London, with full-time editorial staff in the US, UK, Brazil, Germany and China.

Overview 
Recharge was first established in January 2009 as a weekly newspaper, before becoming a monthly glossy magazine in January 2013.

Recharge has been described as "one of the most authoritative publications in the renewable energy sector", and as "a role model for the future of trade journalism" by German industrial giant Siemens.

Its breaking stories have been picked up by major international news organizations, including the BBC, The Washington Post and Denmark's Dagbladet Børsen.

It also produces Daily newspapers at industry trade events including the European Wind Energy Association's (now WindEurope's) annual conference and exhibition and biannual offshore iteration, as well as for the American Wind Energy Association's annual expo.recharge

Thought Leaders Summit
Recharge'''s "Thought Leaders Summit" is an annual invitation-only forum for senior international renewable-energy executives that was held for the first in Holmenkollen (Norway) on 9 January 2014.

The inaugural meeting was attended by 50 senior professionals from the global renewable-energy industry, including high-level executives from Siemens, Vestas, Statoil and E.ON. The keynote speech was delivered by Scotland's energy minister, Fergus Ewing and the event was officially opened by Henrik O. Madsen.

The colloquium, which operates under the Chatham House rule, was most recently held in Hamburg, Germany, on 25 September 2018 ahead of the Global Wind Summit, supported by WindEurope and Hamburg Messe and sponsored by MHI Vestas, GE and Lloyds Register.

Awards
In 2010, Recharge'' was awarded the Advocate of the Year award by the UK's Renewable Energy Association, the first time the prize had been given to a publication.

References

External links

Monthly magazines published in the United Kingdom
Business magazines published in the United Kingdom
Energy magazines
Environmental magazines
Magazines established in 2009
Magazines published in London
Online magazines published in the United Kingdom